The men's 200 metre team swimming was an event on the swimming at the 1900 Summer Olympics schedule in Paris. It was held on August 12, 1900. 20 swimmers from two nations constituted four teams; 18 of the swimmers actually swam. The event was won by the German Swimming Federation, defeating three French teams. Tritons Lillois took silver, Pupilles de Neptune de Lille bronze, and Libellule de Paris fourth place.

Background

This was the only time a team swimming event was held. The competition was supposed to include five teams, but a team from Great Britain arrived after the start of the competition.

Competition format

There were four heats, with five swimmers in each heat.

Scoring used a fairly strange system: swimmers were seeded into the final heats through an initial ranking round, then received a number of points depending on what place they received in which heat. The five swimmers in the first heat were given between 1 and 5 points, with the winner receiving 1 and points increasing with place. The swimmers in the second heat received between 6 and 10 points, and so on.

The scores of the five swimmers on a team were summed, and the team with the fewest points won. This gave a strong advantage to the German team, which had three swimmers in the first heat, and an equally strong disadvantage to the Parisian team, with three swimmers in the fourth heat.

If points are given by best time regardless of heat, the Pupilles de Neptune and the Tritons switch places, though the Germans still win and the Parisian team still takes fourth.

Each race was 200 metres long. This swimming event used freestyle swimming, which means that the method of the stroke is not regulated (unlike backstroke, breaststroke, and butterfly events).

Schedule

Results

Round 1

Each team had one swimmer in each of the five first-round heats. These heats determined in which final heat the swimmer would swim and thus the point range that the swimmer could achieve. No times are known from the results of this round.

Round 1 heat 1

Round 1 heat 2

Round 1 heat 3

Round 1 heat 4

Round 1 heat 5

Final

Final heat 1

Final heat 2

Final heat 3

Final heat 4

Did not start

The following two swimmers did not compete and thus earned 19 points for their teams:
 Herbert von Petersdorff, German Swimming Federation
 Philippe Houben, Pupilles de Neptune de Lille

Team scores

Notes

References
 International Olympic Committee medal database
Official Olympic Report

Swimming at the 1900 Summer Olympics